Muhammad Faiz bin Mazlan (born 20 January 1997) is a Malaysian footballer who plays as an attacking midfielder for Malaysia Super League club Kelantan on loan from Penang.

Career statistics

Club

References

External links
 

1997 births
Living people
Malaysian footballers
People from Selangor
Felda United F.C. players
Penang F.C. players
Petaling Jaya City FC players
Kelantan F.C. players
Malaysia Super League players
Association football midfielders